Palladium(II) dicyanide is the inorganic compound with the formula Pd(CN)2.  A grey solid, it is a coordination polymer.  It was the first palladium compound isolated in pure form. In his attempts to produce pure platinum metal in 1804, W.H. Wollaston added mercuric cyanide to a solution prepared by dissolving impure platinum in aqua regia. This precipitated palladium cyanide which was then ignited to recover palladium metal—a new element.

Structure 
It had long been suspected that the structure of palladium cyanide consists of square planar Pd(II) centers linked by cyanide bridging ligands, which are bonded through both the carbon and nitrogen atoms. The CN vibration in the infrared spectra of Pd(CN)2, at 2222 cm−1, is typical of bridging cyanide ion. It is now known that the compound commonly known as "palladium(II) cyanide" is in fact a nanocrystaline material better described using the formula Pd(CN)2.0.29H2O. The interior of the sheets do indeed consist of square-planar palladium ions linked by head-to-tail disordered bridging cyanide groups to form 4,4-nets. These sheets are approximately 3 nm x 3 nm in size and are terminated by an equal number of water and cyanide groups maintaining the charge neutrality of the sheets. These sheets then stack with very little long range order resulting in Bragg diffraction patterns with very broad peaks. The Pd-C and Pd-N bond lengths, determined using total neutron diffraction, are both 1.98 Å.

Properties and reactions 
Palladium dicyanide is insoluble in water with a solubility product of log Ksp = -42.

The equilibrium constant for the competition reaction
PdL2+ + 4CN−  [Pd(CN)4]2− + L
In the above equation, L is 1,4,8,11-tetraazaundecane ("2,3,2-tet")
was found to have a value of log K = 14.5. Combination with the formation of the palladium complex with the tetradentate ligand 
[Pd(H2O)4]2+ + L  PdL2+ + 4 H2O, log K = 47.9
gives
[Pd(H2O)4]2+ + 4CN−  [Pd(CN)4]2− + 4H2O, log β4 = 62.3.
This appears to be the highest formation constant known for any metal ion.

The affinity of Pd(II) for cyanide is so great that palladium metal is attacked by cyanide solutions:
Pd(s)  +  2 H+  +  4 CN−    [Pd(CN)4]2−  +  H2
This reaction is reminiscent of the "cyanide process" for the extraction of gold, although in the latter reaction O2 is proposed to be involved, to give H2O.

Exchange of between free cyanide ion and [Pd(CN)4]2− has been evaluated by 13C NMR spectroscopy.  That exchange occurs at all illustrates the ability of some compounds to be labile (fast reactions) but also stable (high formation constants).  The reaction rate is described as follows:
rate = k2[M(CN)42−][CN−], where k2 120 M−1−s−1
The bimolecular kinetics implicate a so-called associative pathway.  The associative mechanism of exchange entails rate-limiting attack of cyanide on [Pd(CN)4]2−, possibly with the intermediacy of a highly reactive pentacoordinate species  [Pd(CN)5]3−.  By comparison, the rate constant for [Ni(CN)4]2− is > 500,000 M−1−s−1, whereas [Pt(CN)4]2−exchanges more slowly at 26 M−1s−1.  Such associative reactions are characterized by large negative entropies of activation, in this case: -178 and -143 kJ/(mol·K) for Pd and Pt, respectively.

Pd(CN)2 has few uses.  It has been demonstrated to facilitate the synthesis of alkenyl nitriles from olefins. and as a catalyst in the regioselective reaction between cyanotrimethylsilane and oxiranes.

See also
 Nickel dicyanide

References

Palladium compounds
Cyanides
Two-dimensional nanomaterials
Coordination polymers